Calcinate is a town and comune in the province of Bergamo, Lombardy, northern Italy. Its economy is mostly based on industry.

History
The origin of the town are Gaulish and Roman, though it is first mentioned in a document from 1148. It was conquered by the Republic of Venice in the 15th century, and remained to it until 1797. In that period it became a flourishing agricultural centre.

Main sights
Santa Maria Assunta - baroque parish church 
San Martino (c. 14th century) - romanesque church

People
Pietro Vierchowod (born 1959), footballer for Sampdoria, Roma and Milan
Manolo Gabbiadini (born 1991), footballer for Sampdoria
Melania Gabbiadini (born 1983), retired footballer for Verona 
Andrea Belotti (born 1993), footballer for Torino
Vincenzo Vecchi (born 1970), anarchist.

References